St Mary's Catholic High School is a Catholic, co-educational, secondary school with academy status in Upper Newbold, Chesterfield, Derbyshire, which specialises in the teaching of Maths and History.

It received a School Achievements Award for the third time in 2003, and has approximately 1,400 pupils attending, including over 250 sixth form students.

The school was rated Outstanding in all areas by Ofsted in October 2012.

History

Beginnings
The school opened on 8 January 1856. It was part of the Church of the Annunciation, a Roman Catholic church in Chesterfield built by the Society of Jesus (Jesuits) and completed in 1854. The church at the time was also known as St Mary's. The school later moved to a site on Cross Street, also in Chesterfield, around 100 meters from the church. The buildings on Cross Street are now home to St Mary's Roman Catholic Primary School, a feeder school to St Mary's Roman Catholic High School. Both schools are linked with the Church of the Annunciation.

In 1997, the school adopted the motto that now adorns the school badge, "Gaudium et Spes", meaning, "Joy and Hope".

The school's mission is, "Live, love and learn in the light of Christ".

Present campus
The campus was built on livestock fields at Upper Newbold. A former road, Water Lane, used to run through the school site before it was closed in the 1970s due to fatal accidents. The right of way as a footpath remained open, however, until it was stopped up in 2005.

The school was designed by the Ellis-Williams Architecture Partnership to echo the atmosphere of an Italian village, with the original buildings located around a central courtyard, called the Precinct.

The first brick was laid on 30 May 1978. Phase 1, consisting of the Gym, Drama Hall and Music room (the current IT2) Block and the Admin, Design Technology and Canteen Blocks were handed over by the developer on 27 November 1980. Work was underway on Phase 2 (Art, Chemistry, and Humanities) and this was completed by the summer of 1981. The school grounds opened to pupils in September 1981, although construction of the Biology and Language Blocks (Phase 3) was still underway. Phase 4, the Sixth Form block, was completed in 1984 along with its architectural highlight 'the Bridge'. Phase 5 was never constructed. The large playing fields were finally handed over by the developer in the mid-1980s, much later than planned, due to issues with landscaping and coal mining shafts being discovered. A primary school was marked on plans for the East 'mound' area of the field, but this was cancelled in the late 1980s.

The present campus was officially opened in 1982, one year after its completion. In 1996, a new Music Block and Maths/Physics Block were built, and in 2000 a new building was built to house the school's I.C.T. facilities and sixth form study.

In the middle of 2002, work in building an all-weather astro-turf sports pitch was completed. The pitch has facilities for football and hockey, and is floodlit for use during the evening, particularly for after-school sports fixtures and the Chesterfield Hockey Club.

In September 2003, work on a £1.6 million Sports Hall was started, the building was completed in June 2004. The building was dedicated, and blessed in the same month.

In 2004, work started on a new building to house the school's English Department; this was completed in the middle of 2005 and features five classrooms, three offices, and toilet facilities.

On the morning of 15 March 2011, a bus carrying pupils to school collided with a bridge near Barrow Hill. The single decker bus, which usually operated the route, was not operating that morning and so a replacement bus - a double decker prohibited from the route due to low bridges - was run instead. One student was seriously injured, with seventeen others sustaining minor injuries.

In 2014, work began on a new Drama Studio next to the Music Block, to replace the original one in the Humanities Block, which is now Learning Support. The new Drama Studio was completed in the middle of 2015. The Drama Hall was also extended at this time and electronically controlled movable seating was added.

At the start of the 2018/19 academic year, Caterlink took over the Year 7–11 school canteen. The school underwent a renovation project from July 2018 to February 2019, which included the installation of a partially new tannoy system, addressable fire alarm system, LED lighting and new ceiling tiles to improve the school's energy efficiency.

Future of campus 

There are plans to construct a two-storey Maths and Chemistry block on the lower courts 'Cage' area. A large sum of money was spent replacing the tannoy system, ceiling tiles, lights and getting a new fire alarm system installed between July 2018 and February 2019. This, combined with the solar panels installed in 2015, has greatly increased the school's energy efficiency.

Sesquicentennial
The school celebrated its sesquicentennial (150th anniversary) on 30 January 2015. A competition took place during art lessons to design a new logo for the school. A time capsule was buried in the “Alleyway” between the Admin and Sixth Form blocks, to be opened in 2065. There is a plaque located above the site of it. Planting of trees also took place to replace the one destroyed by the extension of the Drama Hall.

A history book of the school, written by former pupil Leonie Martin, was published in 2015 to mark the anniversary.

Phoenix Garden 
The school allotment near the top car park was originally created in 2009 by the Learning Support and Maths Departments. It consisted of nine vegetable beds with a small seating area nearby with a memorial dedicated to a member of staff who helped with constructing the allotment area. This memorial has since been cut off from the adjacent garden by a perimeter security fence and the garden-memorial area is now off limits to all students.

In the summer of 2019, a number of pupils and members of support staff began redeveloping the allotment to transform it into a relaxing sensory garden and picnic area. This coincided with St Mary's becoming an attachment aware school.

Staff 
The school has around 120 staff, including teaching assistants, plus midday supervisors, cooks, caretakers and cleaners. The head is Mrs M J Dengate, who has been the head since Easter 2017, when Sean McClafferty resigned.

The former deputy head teacher, Susan Cain, was awarded the Benemerenti medal by the Pope upon her retirement in December 2020, following 35 years of service to education at the school. The school now has a leadership team comprising deputy head teacher Mr A Breedon and several assistant head teachers.

School houses 
St Mary's has six school houses which compete in the school's various inter-house events (primarily sport). The house names reflect the school's Catholic ethos:

Alpha - The house symbol is the Greek letter alpha
Omega - The house symbol is the Greek letter omega
Pax - Sign of peace holy spirit and the house symbol is a dove.
Chi Rho - The symbol is the first two letters of the Greek word for Christ (chi = x and rho = p) superimposed.
Ichthus  - The house symbol is a fish which was used by early Christians
Pneuma - The house symbol is a flame, signifying the everlasting flame of Christ and breath of God.

The house symbols appear on the pupils' badges. The colour of the picture shows which year group they belong to and the color is retained until the pupil leaves Year 11.

Extracurricular activities and school trips 
The school runs a variety of extracurricular activities at lunch times, including board games, PE, cooking and science clubs. There are many after school PE practices and clubs for local sports tournaments  held at lunchtimes and after schools.

Several school trips also take place throughout the year, excluding music concerts and GCSE subject trips. These include language trips to France, Germany and Spain, excursions or religious retreats to the Hayes Conference Centre and Hartington and the Hallam youth pilgrimage to Lourdes each June.

Choir and drama productions
The school has several choirs spanning all year groups. The school has its own male voice choir - "Manflesh" - formed after the Chamber Choir ended in the middle of 2007. The male choir made its first appearance at the 2007 Crooked Spire concert, singing 'Gaudete' and 'A La Ruru Nino'. 2008 saw Manflesh sing at the Winding Wheel, and then in July, along with the other school choirs, tour Venice singing at St Mark's Basilica and San Giovanni. In 2013, "Mini Manflesh" was added to the list of choirs, an all-male choir for lower years. The school holds concerts throughout the year at different venues and has a large band that performs in the three masses in the school year. The choir continuously tours around parts of Europe during the summer months, singing in cathedrals.

The school also runs drama productions every couple of years, these have included: Grease (2016), and Our House (2019).

School status and media appearances
St. Mary's is a DfES designated Language College and Academy.

St Mary's performance is considerably higher than the local and national average, and was recognised as "particularly successful" by Ofsted in 1993–4 and 1997–8. It was then rated as 'Outstanding' in October 2012.

The school has no specific geographical catchment area (like other schools in the area) and so can choose pupils from church parishes in Chesterfield, though all Catholic applicants are generally accepted regardless of academic ability.

The school adopted the song "Let Us Build A School" as their official school hymn in 2006. This was then replaced with 'Live Love and Learn In the Light of Christ' although both ‘shine Jesus shine’ and ‘here I am lord’ are considered more popular with both students and staff. In January 2018, former pupils Harry and Laurence Maguire visited the school.

On Wednesday 4 July 2018, Tanya Arnold from BBC Look North interviewed former teachers of Harry Maguire, Mr McKee and Mr Bradley, along with several Year 7 pupils.

On Thursday 4 October 2018, Gary Lineker visited the school along with Harry Maguire as part of The Premier League Show. They visited Harry's younger sister, Daisy, in an Art lesson, joined in a PE lesson on the Astro and interviewed Martin McKee (Head of P.E. and Harry's P.E. teacher) before the interviews in the Library after school.

On 26 February 2019, a Sixth Form assembly with Keith Sudbury, the founder of an organ donation charity, featured on BBC Breakfast. The assembly had been filmed in November 2018.

Notable alumni
Lee Rowley, Conservative MP for North East Derbyshire (UK Parliament constituency)
Alicia Barrett, athlete
Harry Maguire, professional footballer who played for England in the 2018 FIFA World Cup
Jake Beesley, footballer for Blackpool F.C.
Laurence Maguire, footballer for Chesterfield F.C.

References

School Prospectus

External links

Educational institutions established in 1856
Catholic secondary schools in the Diocese of Hallam
Secondary schools in Derbyshire
Schools in Chesterfield, Derbyshire
1856 establishments in England
Academies in Derbyshire